Shu, Kazakhstan may refer to:

 Shu, in the Sozak District in South Kazakhstan Province
 Town of Shu, in Kazakhstan's Akmola Oblast
 Shu, Jambyl, frequently referred to as "Shu Station"
 Shu or Chu River